Anthony Gordon (born August 28, 1997) is an American football quarterback who is a free agent. He played college football for the Washington State Cougars and went undrafted in the 2020 NFL Draft.

Early years
Gordon attended Terra Nova High School in Pacifica, California. During his career he passed for 8,305 yards and 81 touchdowns.

College career
Gordon played at City College of San Francisco in 2015. In the one season, he completed 286 of 439 passes for 3,864 yards and 37 touchdowns.

In 2016 he transferred to Washington State University. He redshirted his first year in 2016 and did not play in any games in 2017. In 2018, he served as the backup to Gardner Minshew. In 2019, Gordon was named the starter and threw for 48 TDs, second most in the nation behind Heisman Trophy winner Joe Burrow, who went first overall in the 2020 NFL Draft.

Statistics

Professional career

Seattle Seahawks
Gordon signed with the Seattle Seahawks as an undrafted free agent on May 1, 2020. He was waived on September 5, 2020.

Kansas City Chiefs
On January 12, 2021, Gordon signed a reserve/futures contract with the Kansas City Chiefs. He was waived on August 23, 2021.

Denver Broncos
Gordon was signed to the Denver Broncos practice squad on December 21, 2021.

Kansas City Chiefs (second stint)
On April 27, 2022, Gordon signed with the Kansas City Chiefs. He was waived on May 10, 2022.

Personal life
His uncle, Greg Reynolds, played professional baseball for multiple Major League Baseball teams.

References

External links
Washington State Cougars bio

1997 births
Living people
People from Pacifica, California
Players of American football from California
American football quarterbacks
City College of San Francisco Rams football players
Washington State Cougars football players
Seattle Seahawks players
Kansas City Chiefs players
Sportspeople from the San Francisco Bay Area
Denver Broncos players